Howmeh Rural District is a rural district (dehestan) in the Central District of Bijar County, Kurdistan Province, Iran. At the 2006 census, its population was 4,081, in 981 families. The rural district has 35 villages.

References 

Rural Districts of Kurdistan Province
Bijar County